The Korea Times Music Festival (originally titled Korean Music Festival until 2013) is an annual event held at the Hollywood Bowl in the United States. Featuring artists from South Korea's K-pop music industry, the organizers describe it as one of the largest music festivals held in Southern California.

The festival was founded and organized by The Korea Times to give Korean Americans residing in southern California an opportunity to stay in touch with Korean culture. The first festival in 2003 was 'in celebration of the centennial anniversary of the Korean immigration to the United States'.

Attendance figures

The inaugural concert in 2003 sold out 18,000 seats within 14 days and subsequent shows in the following years have also sold out; organizers noted that the number of non-Koreans attending the music festival has increased substantially. According to The Korea Times, about 95 percent of the tickets sold in 2008 were purchased by non-Koreans, with many fans coming from all around the United States as well as from other Asian and European countries to attend the concert.

Timeline

2003
The 1st Korean Music Festival was held in 2003.

2004
The 2nd Korean Music Festival was held on October 16, 2004.

Artists (21 total):

2005
The 3rd Korean Music Festival was held on April 23, 2005.

Artists (13 total):

2006
The 4th Korean Music Festival was held on May 20, 2006

Artists (22 total): 

Theme: World Cup Soccer

2007
The 5th Korean Music Festival was held on May 5, 2007

Artists (18 total): 

Theme: We Are One

2008
The 6th Korean Music Festival was held on May 17, 2008

Artists (15 total):

2009 
The 7th Korean Music Festival was held on May 9, 2009

Artists (14 total):

2010
Korean Music Festival 8 was held on May 1, 2010.

Artists (13 total):

2011
Korean Music Festival 9 was held on April 30, 2011.

Artists (16 total):

2012
Korean Music Festival 10 was held on April 28, 2012.

Artists (11 total):

2013
The Korea Times Music Festival 11 was held on April 27, 2013. This was the festival's first year under its present name.

Artists (13 total):

2014
The 12th Korea Times Music Festival was held on May 3, 2014.

2015
The 13th Korea Times Music Festival was held on May 2, 2015.

2016
The 14th Korea Times Music Festival was held on May 7, 2016.

Artists (15 total)

2017
The 15th Korea Times Music Festival was held on April 29, 2017.

Artists (12 total)

2018
The 16th Korea Times Music Festival was held on April 28, 2018.

Artists (12 total)

See also

List of K-Pop concerts held outside Asia

References

External links

Recurring events established in 2000
Music venues in Los Angeles
Korean-American culture in Los Angeles
K-pop concerts
K-pop festivals
Music festivals established in 2002